Senator Olsen may refer to:

Alan Olsen (born 1947), Oregon State Senate
Luther Olsen (born 1951), Wisconsin State Senate

See also
Rick Olseen (born 1956), Minnesota State Senate
Senator Olson (disambiguation)